"Basquiat" is a song by Pentagon, a South Korean boy group who participated in a reality boy group survival show, Road to Kingdom. It was released digitally on June 12, 2020. The song is the fourth song from the extended play Road to Kingdom Final.

Pentagon finished the show as the series' second runner-up.

Background, composition and lyrics 
Basquiat is a dance song of the electronic rock genre. This song was inspired by Jean-Michel Basquiat's paintings, and it is a song that contains a great message of "regaining freedom" to many who live in oppression and neglect.

The specific lyrics "I'm the new Basquiat, look down at me / see the meaningless crown light down / Shine Mother Nature's View / God bless you / fly up in search of the answer." Member and composer Hui responded,  Reporter Son Hwa-sin wrote, "Pentagon talked about winning and losing, the shell of competition, and the meaninglessness of the crown. They conveyed this message through this song....The passage 'no meaning' is impressive. From the standpoint of Mother Nature and God, the fierce and bloody fights of humans may be really meaningless. And the really important thing is to fly up in search of your own answer."

Live performances 
Pentagon performed "Basquiat" for the first time in the Road to Kingdom final live broadcast on June 18, 2020. The final stage started with an intro video of someone being chased or rebelliously screamed by someone. Hui showcased his sixth treble in the second half of the song gave an exhilarating thrill and said, "I resist the gaze created by the times / My crown, I write and write for myself" and ended with Pentagon members who raised their hands toward the sky, leaving a strong reverberation and afterglow for those who go beyond the spleen. At the end of the stage, the following phrase appeared as a message penetrating this song, "I resist the gaze created by the times. My crown is made and written by myself."

Reception 
Several Korean media outlets wrote, "Pentagon built the genre of 'Pentagon' with energetic performance and music in 'Road to Kingdom', and captured the hearts of the viewers perfectly, making it a strong winner."

Promotion
"Basquiat" intro VCR was released on June 19.

Pentagon released a group concept image and video of the song "Basquiat" through their official homepage and SNS on June 22. The posts uploaded contain images of the members' backs, short videos moving forward with black flags in the blazing wasteland, with description "#Pentagon 'Basquiat' Coming soon".

On June 21, 2020, the group performed the single on KCON:TACT 2020 Summer.

After releasing the track "Basquiat" on music streaming sites on June 12, a concept image and videos were released beginning June 23 until June 30, 2020.

Credits and personnel 
Credits are adapted from Melon.

 Pentagon  – vocals
  Hui – producing, songwriting 
  Wooseok – producing, songwriting, rap arrangement
 네이슨 (NATHAN) – producing, record engineering, piano, synthesizer, string
 Yunji – producing, record engineering, piano, synthesizer, string
 Soulman – chorus
 Kim Ho-hyun – guitar 
 Jeon Hoon – guitar 
 Jeon Jae-hee – chorus
 전부연  – Recording
 Shin Jae-bin  – mixed
 Kwon Nam-woo  – mastering

Charts

References

External links

2020 singles
2020 songs
Pentagon (South Korean band) songs
Cube Entertainment singles
Korean-language songs
Songs written by Hui (singer)
Songs written by Wooseok